I Am Self Sufficient is a 1976 Italian comedy film directed by and starring Nanni Moretti.

Cast
 Nanni Moretti as Michele Apicella
 Simona Frosi as Simona
 Fabio Traversa as Fabio
 Luciano Agati as Giuseppe
 Franco Moretti as the buddhist

References

External links
 

1976 comedy films
1976 films
Films directed by Nanni Moretti
Italian comedy films
1970s Italian-language films
Films set in Rome
1976 directorial debut films
1970s Italian films